Hattmatt is a commune in the Bas-Rhin department in Grand Est in north-eastern France.

The village is located a few kilometres to the northeast of Saverne on the departmental road RD6.

Geography
The river Zinsel passes through the village. The surrounding villages are Rosenwiller, Steinbourg, Dossenheim-sur-Zinsel, and Imbsheim.

History
According to oral tradition, the birthplace of Hattmattois was in Wiesenau (now defunct) along Rosenwiller near Dettwiller. As the war outraged peasants, houses were burned and the population decimated. The few survivors wondered then WER HAT HÈ MOT, which means who has a meadow (field) hence the origin of HATT MOT (Hattmatt).

Other sources  affirm the two villages existed at the same time. Wiesenau was an independent village of Hattmatt rather scattered habitat type (hamlet), which probably disappeared during the invasions of the Armagnacs (Armengecken) in the fifteenth century. Wiesenau is no longer mentioned as a village thereafter. There was, therefore, no longer anything in the Peasant War of 1525. It was Hattmatt Hanau-Lichtenberg who obtained the tenancy of the bank of the lost village. After a trial during the Revolution, Hattmatt obtained ownership of this bank (1793).

As for the etymology of the name, the most plausible is that of the Germanic root associated with the suffix of Hatto matt (pre). So the pre Hatto.

Administration

See also
 Communes of the Bas-Rhin department

References

Communes of Bas-Rhin
Bas-Rhin communes articles needing translation from French Wikipedia